Gonzalo Sebastián Papa Palleiro (born 8 May 1989), commonly known as Gonzalo Papa, is a Uruguayan professional footballer who plays as a defensive midfielder for Peruvian club Ayacucho FC.

Club career
Papa started his career playing with Centro Atlético Fénix in 2009. He made his debut on 22 August 2009 against River Plate.

International career

Under-22
In 2011, he was named to participate in the Uruguay national football team under-22 squad for the 2011 Pan American Games.

References

External links

1989 births
Living people
Footballers from Montevideo
Uruguayan footballers
Uruguayan expatriate footballers
Association football midfielders
Uruguayan Primera División players
Argentine Primera División players
Primera Nacional players
Peruvian Primera División players
Centro Atlético Fénix players
Arsenal de Sarandí footballers
Villa Dálmine footballers
Club Agropecuario Argentino players
Ayacucho FC footballers
Footballers at the 2011 Pan American Games
Pan American Games medalists in football
Pan American Games bronze medalists for Uruguay
Uruguayan expatriate sportspeople in Argentina
Uruguayan expatriate sportspeople in Peru
Expatriate footballers in Argentina
Expatriate footballers in Peru
Medalists at the 2011 Pan American Games